Ultimate Domain, known as Genesia in Europe, is a computer game developed by Microïds and published by Mindscape initially on the Commodore Amiga in 1993 and then ported for the IBM PC in 1994. The original Amiga version is known to be one of the few commercial games developed in AMOS Basic.

In 2011, an iPad version was released. A follow-up to Ultimate Domain named Genesia Legacy was scheduled to be released in 2015.

Plot
Ultimate Domain starts in the 17th century in the colonies of the new world, where the player has four settlers and a few raw materials. The settlers take jobs such as woodcutter, architect, and specialist; woodcutters turn trees into logs, architects use wood, stone, and metal to make various kinds of buildings, and specialists make goods for selling once a shop is built. The settlers may also search for "The Seven Jewels of Genesia".

Reception
Computer Gaming World rated Ultimate Domain one star out of five. Describing it as a lackluster combination of Populous and Civilization, the magazine reported that it was possible to win the game without expanding from the starting position, concluding that "If that doesn't sound a death knell for a game of empire building, I don't know what does". The game was reviewed in 1995 in Dragon #213 by Jay & Dee in the "Eye of the Monitor" column. Both reviewers gave the game 2 out of 5 stars.

Reviews
PC Gamer - Jul, 1994
ASM (Aktueller Software Markt) - Dec, 1993
Amiga Power - Jan, 1994
Amiga Format - Jan, 1994
PC Player (Germany) - May, 1994

References

External links
Ultimate Domain at MobyGames
Genesia at the Hall of Light

1993 video games
4X video games
Amiga games
DOS games
iOS games
Microïds games
Mindscape games
The Software Toolworks games
Video games developed in France